Daniel Brodhead II (April 20, 1693 - July 22, 1755), was a captain in the Ulster County, New York militia. He was the first person of European descent to permanently settle the area of Stroudsburg, Pennsylvania.  He was a justice of the peace for Bucks County, Pennsylvania from 1747 to 1749. He was friendly with the Native Americans as well as with the Moravian Church missionaries.

Biography
He was born on April 20, 1693 in Marbletown, New York to Captain Richard Brodhead (1666-1758) and Margriet Jans Matthyssen. On September 19, 1719 he married Hester Wyngart.

In 1737, Brodhead received a warrant of 600 acres in Bucks County (now Monroe County along the east bank of the Analomink or Smithfield Creek, which is now named Brodhead Creek. The land is near where Lehigh Valley Hospital-Pocono now stands. An additional warrant for 150 acres on the west bank was given to Brodhead in 1750.

He was a justice of the peace for Bucks County, Pennsylvania from September 25, 1747 to 1749.

He died on July 22, 1755 in Bethlehem, Pennsylvania.

Legacy
He left each of his four sons: Daniel Brodhead, Garret, Luke, and John, 150 acres from his estate.  Colonel Daniel Brodhead sold his land share to brother Garret.  This became the site of the Flory home at 170 North Courtland Street, the oldest extant home in East Stroudsburg.

References

1755 deaths
1693 births
American justices of the peace